Rhön (A1443) is the lead ship of the s of the German Navy. She was commissioned at Kiel, Germany on 23 September 1977.

Construction and career 
Rhön was originally built for civilian service by Kröger of Rendsburg in 1974. On 23 September 1977 she was commissioned into the German Navy, based at Kiel, Germany.

On 23 October 1988, Rhön was in collision with the American destroyer , badly damaging Haylers stern.

Rhön participated in BALTOPS 2020.

References 

 

1974 ships
Rhön-class tankers
Ships built in Rendsburg 
Tankers of Germany